Daisy Expósito-Ulla is Partner/President-CEO of d expósito & Partners, a Hispanic marketing and communications agency created in September 2006. She was the chairman and CEO of Young & Rubicam's Bravo Group until she resigned in 2004.

Expósito-Ulla, who was born in Cuba, has a bachelor's degree from the New York Institute of Technology.

Recognition 
In 2015, Expósito-Ulla was named one of the 25 most powerful women by People En Español.

References 

Cuban emigrants to the United States
Living people
New York Institute of Technology alumni
American women chief executives
Year of birth missing (living people)
21st-century American women